Redowl is an unincorporated community in Meade County, in the U.S. state of South Dakota.

History
A post office called Redowl was established in 1908. The community takes its name from nearby Red Owl Creek.

References

Unincorporated communities in Meade County, South Dakota
Unincorporated communities in South Dakota